Grace McDougall or Grace Alexandra Smith or Grace Ashley-Smith (1887 – 1963) was a British officer of the First Aid Nursing Yeomanry (FANY). She is credited with reinventing that organisation and with being the first khaki bride. She gained British, French and Belgian medals.

Life
McDougall was born in Aberdeen in 1887. Her name was Grace Alexandra Smith but she created the surname of Ashley-Smith. She attended Albyn School before spending a year at Aberdeen University. She then went to a Belgian convent for two years to learn French. She was a sportsperson and she won an Empire Medal for her shooting in 1911.

She joined the First Aid Nursing Yeomanry (FANY) because of the word "Yeomanry" in the title as she wanted to ride horses. The FANY was formed to both rescue the wounded and to administer first aid from horseback. Their founder felt that a single rider could get to a wounded soldier faster than a horse-drawn ambulance. Each woman was trained not only in first aid but signalling and drilling in cavalry movements.

At the start of 1912 2nd Lieutenant Lilian Franklin and McDougall (Sergeant-Major Ashley-Smith) won a power struggle with the FANY founder Edward Baker and his daughter, Katie. In 1912 the FANY uniform became a khaki tunic, khaki riding skirt and later a khaki soft cap. Franklin and Ashley-Smith were in charge; before the First World War started in 1914, Ashley-Smith was sure that the FANY had a useful role and she intended to find it. She and Franklin are credited with reinventing the FANY after the disagreement with the founders had been settled.

First World War

Immediately war was declared, she returned from South Africa where she was visiting her sister. She was soon in France where she drove a Belgian ambulance to pick up wounded in support of a British war hospital. It was in France that she met her future husband who had also recently travelled from South Africa. When Ghent was taken by the German army the British left. However she stayed to care for a dying soldier and she was captured. She was arrested but managed to smuggle letters out and with assistance she escaped and returned home.

She returned to Belgium in time for the first battle of Ypres where the casualties were in the thousands. She led a crew of eleven made up of nurses, FANY members, and her brother who drove an ambulance. The ambulance was new as she had persuaded a garage owner from Aberdeen to donate the vehicle to the cause.

She was said to be the first bride to marry whilst wearing Khaki at her wedding at All Saints' Church in Maidenhead, on 22 January 1915.

At the end of the war, the FANYs in Belgium were reticent to leave their life together and return home. McDougall's decision was made for her because her mother was critically ill so she had to return. It fell to McDougall's second in command, Mary Baxter Ellis, to demobilize the FANYs and send them back to civilian life at home. The decision was made after seeing soldiers returning from the war and unable to get work as mechanics and it was felt that men should have the jobs.

Recognition
Ordre de la Couronne (Belgium)
Ordre de Leopold II (Belgium)
Mons medal 
1914–18 service medal 
Victory medal
Croix de Guerre (silver star; France)
Médaille d'honneur (France)
Médaille des épidémies
Médaille secours des blessés militaires
Médaille de la reine Élisabeth (Belgium)
one of the few women to earn the rosette to the Mons star.

References

Bibliography

1887 births
1963 deaths
People educated at Albyn School
People from Aberdeen
British women in World War I
Female nurses in World War I
First Aid Nursing Yeomanry people